WSWR may refer to:

 WSWR (FM), a radio station based in Shelby, Ohio, USA (known as WMAN-FM from December 2011 until May 2012)
 Wilts, Somerset and Weymouth Railway, a former railway company in the West Country of England.